Pure-FTPd is a free (BSD license) FTP Server with a strong focus on software security. It can be compiled and run on a variety of Unix-like computer operating systems including Linux, OpenBSD, NetBSD, FreeBSD, DragonFly BSD, Solaris, Tru64, Darwin, Irix and HP-UX. It has also been ported to Android.

History 
Pure-FTPd is based on Troll-FTPd, written by Arnt Gulbrandsen while he was working at Trolltech from 1995 to 1999. When Gulbrandsen stopped maintaining Troll-FTPd, Frank Denis created Pure-FTPd in 2001, and it is currently developed by a team led by Denis.

See also 

 List of FTP server software
 vsftpd

References

External links 
 Official Webpage

FTP server software
Free server software
Free file transfer software
IRIX software
Software using the BSD license
Free software programmed in C